Central Maine Community College is a public community college in Auburn, Maine. It is part of the Maine Community College System.

Former names
Founded in 1963 as Androscoggin State Vocational Institute, later changed to Central Maine Vocational Technical Institute, in 1989 its name was changed to Central Maine Technical College. As part of a statewide name change of the technical college system, on July 1, 2003, the school became Central Maine Community College.

Accreditation
Central Maine Community College is accredited by the New England Association of Schools and Colleges.

Student body
Enrollment — approximately 2,700 students.
Student/faculty ratio is 18:1.
96% placement in jobs or education continuation

Campus
Central Maine Community College's physical facilities were enlarged to keep pace with increased demand. 
1967 - Addition completed to the original instructional facility. First residence hall constructed. 
1969 - Extension of the North Wing completed. Entire instructional complex was designated by the State Board of Education as the Louis Jalbert Industrial Center, now Jalbert Hall. 
1972 - Jalbert Hall South Wing was constructed in 1972 and expanded in 1979 and 1986. 
1975 - Two apartment style dormitory buildings and the present dining room/kitchen facilities built. 
1989 - A building to house the Culinary Arts program was completed.
1993 - Kirk Hall dedicated for use on May 6, 1993.
1999 - Lapoint Center approved by voters. 
2002 - Lapoint Center opens and includes classroom, office facilities, student use and library access.
2007 - Rancourt Hall, a co-ed residence hall, opens.
2019 - Addition of an esports arena as part of the new Esports Management program opening the same year.

Off-campus sites
In addition to the main campus in Auburn, (Androscoggin County) Central Maine Community College also serves the educational needs of Franklin, Lincoln, and Oxford Counties.

Housing
CMCC offers four residence halls to provide on-campus accommodations for 253 students. Student population is approximately 60% male and 40% female.

Athletics
Full-time students have the opportunity to try out for intercollegiate sports. Central Maine Community College offers baseball and women's softball in the fall and men's and women's basketball in the winter. The men's basketball team plays in the Maine Small College Conference. The baseball and women's basketball teams play in the Northern New England Small College conference. All of the teams participate in the USCAA. Any other intercollegiate sports or club sports are formed on a student interest basis.

Men's
 Baseball (fall and spring)
 Basketball (winter)
 Cross country (fall)
 Soccer (fall)
 Ice hockey

Women's
 Basketball (winter)
 Cross country (fall)
 Soccer (fall)
 Softball (fall and spring)

The Kirk Hall gymnasium has recreational activities. A weight room is also available and is equipped with various weight-lifting apparatus including a universal weight station.

References

External links

 
Community colleges in Maine
Education in Auburn, Maine
Educational institutions established in 1963
Universities and colleges in Androscoggin County, Maine
Buildings and structures in Auburn, Maine
USCAA member institutions
1963 establishments in Maine